Melbourne City Football Club was an Australian rules football club which played in the Victorian Football Association (VFA) in 1912 and 1913, and was notable for failing to win any matches in that time. The club played its home matches at the East Melbourne Cricket Ground.

History
In the first decade of the 20th century, the Victorian Football Association was strategically determined to field a club based in inner Melbourne to boost its patronage; the Association had mostly represented outer and suburban Melbourne since the majority of its central clubs had formed the breakaway Victorian Football League in 1897, and had further lost its most central club, to the League in 1908. Since 1908, the Association had tried to convince  to become its inner-city team, but without success. Finally, for the 1912 season, the Melbourne City Football Club was established as the inner-city club; it was based at the East Melbourne Cricket Ground, after having also considered the Friendly Societies' Ground (the site of present day Olympic Park) as a home venue. The club wore a dark red coloured guernsey (described as 'claret' in contemporary sources) with white shoulders.

In its two seasons in the Association, Melbourne City was uncompetitive. It finished last in both seasons, losing all thirty-six premiership games it played; a loss by seven points against Port Melbourne in 1913 was its best result. The club's thirty-six consecutive losses was a VFA record until Sandringham lost forty-four consecutive matches from 1940–1945. The club did record comfortable wins in pre-season practice matches against junior clubs in both seasons, indicating the club played at a competitive junior standard, but at well short of senior standard.

The club was in the heart of League territory, so it was competing more directly with the League than any other Association club; as such, it struggled to draw fans or players from its local area, resulting in low interest and an uncompetitive playing list. These inherent handicaps left the club with little hope of improvement; so, on 1 December 1913, Melbourne City formally resigned from the Association, and disbanded as a club.

References

Former Victorian Football League clubs
Australian rules football clubs in Melbourne
Australian rules football clubs established in 1912
Australian rules football clubs disestablished in 1913
1912 establishments in Australia
1913 disestablishments in Australia